Lawrence Kilham (10 August 1910, in Brookline, Massachusetts – 21 September 2000, in Lyme, New Hampshire), was a physician, virologist, amateur ornithologist, and nature writer. He is credited as the discoverer of K virus (1952) and, with L. J. Olivier, Kilham rat virus (1959), the first protoparvovirus identified.

Kilham received his bachelor's degree in 1932 and his M.S. in biology in 1935 from Harvard University and then his M.D. in 1940 from Harvard Medical School. As an intern in Cleveland, Ohio, he married an intern, Jane K. Kilham (1912–1992). Early in WW II, husband and wife went to England, and after D-Day Lawrence Kilham served in field hospitals as a doctor in the Third Army under Patton. In 1945, Lawrence Kilham returned to graduate school to do research on virology and to teach epidemiology. He was a virology researcher from 1949 to 1960 and in 1961 he became a professor at Dartmouth Medical School (Geisel School of Medicine), retiring there as professor emeritus in 1978.

He was elected a fellow of the American Ornithologists' Union in 1974. He was awarded the John Burroughs Medal in 1989 for his 1979 book On Watching Birds.

Lawrence Kilham died at his home in Lyme, New Hampshire on 21 Sep 2000. He was predeceased by his wife and a son, Peter. He was survived by three sons, Benjamin, Michael, and Joshua, and a daughter, Phoebe.

Books

; reissued as

References

External links
Lawrence Kilham Journal of a 1933 expedition to Greenland at Dartmouth College Library

1910 births
2000 deaths
Harvard Medical School alumni
Geisel School of Medicine faculty
American virologists
American nature writers
American male non-fiction writers
John Burroughs Medal recipients
People from Brookline, Massachusetts
People from Lyme, New Hampshire